Diflorasone is a synthetic glucocorticoid corticosteroid which was never marketed. A diacetate ester of diflorasone, diflorasone diacetate, in contrast, has been marketed.

References

Diketones
Fluoroarenes
Glucocorticoids
Pregnanes
Triols
Abandoned drugs